Jan Ignác František Vojta was a Czech composer (*1657-+12.5.1701) of Baroque music and a doctor of medicine.

Apart from notes in the university records, written in his own hand, we have no other primary source information about him. He lived in the Týn quarter in Old Town of Prague. In his day, he was a recognized composer with his own pupils. There is a knowledge only of 27 of his compositions, of which only seven survive – in Brno, Prague, Vienna, and Paris (in the “Codex Rost”).

References

1660s births
17th-century classical composers
17th-century Bohemian people
18th-century deaths
Czech Baroque composers
Czech male classical composers
18th-century classical composers
18th-century male musicians
17th-century male musicians